Ohio University is a major public university located in the Midwestern United States in Athens, Ohio, situated on an  campus. Founded in 1804, it is the oldest university in the Northwest Territory and ninth oldest public university in the United States. Ohio University has 210,000 living alumni, of whom approximately 105,000 stay in the state. Many have gone on to achieve success in a variety of fields, including athletics, journalism, and government.

Politicians

Lawyers

Military

Religious leaders 
 Edward Raymond Ames, Bishop
 Judy Cannato, Catholic author
 Thomas K. Chadwick, Chaplain of the U.S. Coast Guard
 Earl Cranston, pastor; later became a trustee
 Joel Hunter, pastor
 David Hastings Moore, pastor and military commander
 Alex Haas, pastor

Communications

Educators, researchers, scientists

Entertainers and artists

Professional athletes, coaches, and administrators

Business leaders

References 

 
Ohio University alumni